Firing on All Six is the second studio album by Welsh hard rock band Lone Star. The album was released in August 1977. The album was produced by Gary Lyons, who was one of two engineers on their debut album Lone Star. The album entered the UK Albums Charts on 17 September 1977 reaching number 36. It stayed in the charts for 6 weeks. Between their debut album and Firing on All Six, the lead vocalist, Kenny Driscoll, had been replaced by John Sloman.

Steve Woods, manager of Lone Star at the time said:

“We all went down there (Ridge Farm Studio), and the idea was to write a new record, but the band just started smoking masses of dope in bong pipes, and got into these extended jams. It turned into Pink Floyd or funk jams. It was really weird. There was an upstairs area in the barn they were rehearsing in. Pete Hurley had an extended lead attached to his bass so he could he could play up there while lying down, he was so stoned. It was an unbelievable situation. There were women, drugs… nobody was doing any work. They lost sight of their goals. One day the record company came down, unannounced, at three in the afternoon to check how their investment was doing. Everybody was asleep. And they were horrified by the new songs when they heard them.”

Eventually the album was recorded at Utopia Studios in London.

Track listing

Personnel 
Lone Star
 John Sloman – lead vocals
 Tony Smith – guitars, backing vocals
 Paul Chapman – guitars
 Rick Worsnop – keyboards, backing vocals
 Peter Hurley – bass
 Dixie Lee – drums, backing vocals, percussion
Technical
 Gary Lyons – record producer, engineer
 Jeff Wayne – musical arranger
 Curt Evans – album cover design

See also 
 Lone Star discography

References

External links 
 "Firing on All Six" at AllMusic

Epic Records albums
Lone Star (band) albums
1977 albums